Alfredo Germán Ramírez (born 28 October 1988 in Santa Fe) is an Argentine football midfielder. He currently plays for Club Atlético Platense of the Primera B Nacional.

Career
Ramírez made his debut on 18 October 2008 for Colón in a 1-2 home defeat by Independiente at the age of 19.

External links
 Statistics at Irish Times
 Argentine Primera statistics
 

1988 births
Living people
Footballers from Santa Fe, Argentina
Argentine footballers
Argentine expatriate footballers
Association football midfielders
Club Atlético Colón footballers
Rangers de Talca footballers
Boca Unidos footballers
Sport Boys Warnes players
Club y Biblioteca Ramón Santamarina footballers
Sportivo Belgrano footballers
Juventud Unida de Gualeguaychú players
Central Córdoba de Santiago del Estero footballers
Club Atlético Platense footballers
Argentine Primera División players
Bolivian Primera División players
Primera Nacional players
Torneo Federal A players
Argentine expatriate sportspeople in Chile
Argentine expatriate sportspeople in Bolivia
Expatriate footballers in Chile
Expatriate footballers in Bolivia